Ryan Heshka (born 1970) is a Canadian artist and illustrator, born in Manitoba, Canada. Heshka's illustrations have been publicized in notable magazines such as Wall Street Journal, Esquire, Vanity Fair, Playboy, the New York Times and others, as well as professional art publications such as American Illustration, Society of Illustrators, and Communication Arts. His artworks have been featured on the cover of BLAB! books. As a professional artist Heshka has shown in galleries in North America (including Roq La Rue, Seattle, WA; Richard Heller, LA; Copro Nason, LA; Orbit Gallery, New Jersey; Rotofugi, Chicago) and Europe (Feinkust Kruger, Germany; Antonio Colombo Arte Contemporanea, Italy). His work is often considered to be pop surrealism for his surreal scenes, humor, pop culture references and visual language similar to comics and cartoons. He now lives and works in Vancouver, Canada.

Exhibitions
2013 - "Teenage Machine Age", Antonio Colombo Arte Contemporanea; Milan, Italy

2012 - "Disasterama", Roq La Rue Gallery; Seattle, WA

2012 - "Don't Wake Daddy 7" (group show), Feinkunst-Kruger; Hamburg, Germany

2012 - "Ours", Antonio Colombo Arte Contemporanea; Milan, Italy

2011 - "In the Trees: Twin Peaks 20th Anniversary show", Clifton's Brookdale, Los Angeles, CA

2011 - "Instinction", Roq La Rue Gallery; Seattle, WA

2010 - "Don’t Wake Daddy 5" (group show), Feinkunst-Krueger; Hamburg, Germany

2010 - "Super Things", Roq La Rue Gallery; Seattle, Washington

2010 - "Strange Powers" (presented by BLAB!), Rotofugi Gallery; Chicago, IL

2010 - "Lush Life 2" (group show), Roq La Rue Gallery; Seattle, Washington

2009 - "True Self" (group show), Jonathan LeVine Gallery; New York, NY

2009 - "Envirus", Roq La Rue Gallery; Seattle, Washington

2009 - "Ryan Heshka: Electro-Wonders", Harold Golen Gallery; Miami, Florida

2008 - "Don’t Wake Daddy 3" (group show), Feinkunst-Krueger; Hamburg, Germany

2008 - "Ryan Heshka: The OBIT Paintings (a BLAB! show)", Copro Nason Gallery; Santa Monica, CA

2008 - "Sideshow" (group show), Merry Karnowsky Gallery; Los Angeles, CA

2008 - "Ryan Heshka:  Radio Science Funnies Inc. (presented by BLAB!)", Secret Headquarters; Los Angeles, CA

2007 - "Ryan Heshka: Neo-Pulp", Orbit Gallery; West New York, NJ

2007 - "Jolly Gleetime", DVA Gallery; Chicago, IL

2006 - "Ryan Heshka: ABC SpookShow", El Kartel; Vancouver, B.C.

2004 - "Miss Universe",  El Kartel; Vancouver, B.C.

Bibliography
 Welcome to Monster Town (Henry Holt and Co. (BYR); First edition) (July 20, 2010) 
 Welcome to Robot Town (Henry Holt and Co. (BYR); 1 edition) (August 27, 2013) 
 Ryan Heshka's ABC Spookshow (Simply Read Books; 1st edition) (August 28, 2007)

References

External links 
Ryan Heshka's web site
Review of "Teenage Machine Age" exhibition at the Antonio Colombo gallery

1970 births
Living people
Canadian illustrators